Seyed Reza Hosseini Nassab (Persian: سيد رضا حسيني نسب) (born 1960) is an Iranian Twelver Shi'a Marja, currently residing in Canada. He was the President and Imam of the Islamic Centre in Hamburg, Germany, and since 2003 he has served as the President of Shia Islam Federation in Canada.

Hosseini Nassab was born in Yazd, Iran and studied at the Islamic seminary in Qom. He then went to Canada, where he founded Valie Asr Islamic Center in Toronto, and Ahlul Bayt Center in Ottawa. He chaired the Islamic Centre in Hamburg and founded the Cultural Islamic Center in Berlin. In September 2003, he resigned as head of the Islamic Center of Hamburg. He then returned to Canada to found Imam Mahdi Islamic School in Windsor, and Imam Mahdi Islamic Center in Toronto, Ontario.

Publications
Hosseini Nassab has written more than 130 publications about Islamic theology, Shia faith, philosophy, jurisprudence and logic. His publications include:

 The Shia Responds
 Teaching philosophy
 Religion and Politics
 Rights of Women
 The Youths
 Imam Hossein
 Social Ethics
 Formal Logic

See also
List of Maraji
List of Ayatollahs
Shia Islam in Canada
Ismaili Centre, Toronto
List of Canadian Shia Muslims

References

External links
 www.hoseini.org Official website of Ayatollah Hosseini Nassab
 Seyed Reza Hosseini Nassab in the Islamic Encyclopaedia of Germany
 About the management, Islamic Centre Hamburg
 Canada Shia News

Iranian grand ayatollahs
Iranian Islamists
Shia Islamists
1960 births
Living people
People from Yazd
Iranian Canadian
Canadian Shia Muslims